Edward John Boon (born February 22, 1964) is an American video game programmer, voice actor, and director who was employed for over 15 years at Midway Games and since 2011 has worked for Warner Bros. Interactive Entertainment in its daughter company NetherRealm Studios. Boon is best known for the widely popular Mortal Kombat series, which he created with John Tobias, and the Injustice series.

Life and career
Boon was born and raised in Chicago, Illinois, on February 22, 1964, and graduated from high school at Loyola Academy in Wilmette. He earned a Bachelor of Science degree in mathematics and computer science from University of Illinois at Urbana-Champaign.

After graduation, he was employed by Williams Entertainment in their pinball department, working on approximately 20 pinball games over the next two years. During this time, he was called the Mortal Master, an early indicator towards a future creation.

He is the co-creator of the Mortal Kombat fighting game series, along with John Tobias, and served as the series' lead programmer, with Tobias the lead designer, until their partnership dissolved with Tobias' departure from Midway in 2000. Boon named series characters Sonya and Tanya after his sisters Sonia and Tania, while another character, Noob Saibot, was named after Boon and Tobias' reversed surnames. This is also elaborated in their Twitter handles, @noobde and @therealsaibot. Programmer Mike Boon is Ed's younger brother, and has been in his team since Mortal Kombat 4. The Boons are Hispanic and Dominican by ethnicity.

Boon was ranked #100 in IGN's 2009 list of "Top 100 Game Creators" for his involvement in the Mortal Kombat series. He continues to be directly involved with the MK franchise and its multimedia side projects, and has also provided voice acting and motion capture work for the games, most notably providing the voice for the "Come here!" and "Get over here!" catchphrases uttered by Scorpion in every installment of the series as well as all feature films. The 2008 edition of Guinness World Records Gamer's Edition consequently awarded him a world record for the "longest-serving video game voice actor."

In 2018 Mortal Kombat was exhibited in an arcade cabinet at the Chicago New Media 1973–1992 exhibition, curated by jonCates.

Works

Video games

Pinball

Media

References

External links
 Ed Boon on Twitter
 
 

1964 births
Living people
Male actors from Chicago
American computer programmers
American male video game actors
American male voice actors
American people of Dutch descent
American people of English descent
Pinball game designers
University of Illinois Urbana-Champaign alumni
American video game directors
American video game programmers